Hemiphyllodactylus jinpingensis, also known as the Jinping slender gecko, Jinping gypsy gecko, or Jinping dwarf gecko, is a species of gecko. It is found in China (Yunnan). It is named after its type locality, Jinping.

References

Hemiphyllodactylus
Reptiles of China
Endemic fauna of Yunnan
Reptiles described in 1981